Proteasome assembly chaperone 1 is a protein that in humans is encoded by the PSMG1 gene.

References

Further reading